Kalen is a given name. Notable people with the name include:

Kalen Ballage (born 1995), American football player
Kalen Damessi (born 1990), Togolese international footballer
Kalen DeBoer, American football coach and former player
Kalen Porter (born 1985), singer-songwriter from Medicine Hat, Alberta
Kalen Thornton (born 1982), former American football linebacker

See also
Gunnar Källén (1926–1968), Swedish Theoretical physicist and a professor at Lund University
Kalen, a village in North Macedonia
Kälen, a village in Sweden
Kaleń (disambiguation), places in Poland
Kalen Kannu, special Finnish Ice Hockey Award
Kalena
Kallen
Karlen
Kaulen
Kylen